The Muh Sheng Museum of Entomology is a museum of entomology (especially butterflies, used for handicrafts) in Puli Township, Nantou County, Taiwan.

Exhibitions
The museum holds more than 16,000 insect specimens in their exhibition displays, including more than 350 species of butterflies and moths, both indoor and outdoor.

Transportation
The museum is accessible by bus from Taichung Station of Taiwan Railways.

See also
 List of museums in Taiwan

References

External links
  

Natural history museums in Taiwan
Museums in Nantou County
Art museums and galleries in Taiwan
Contemporary crafts museums
Butterfly organizations
Entomological organizations
Museums with year of establishment missing